Andy Wright may refer to:
 Andy Wright, one of the Scottsboro Boys
 Andy Wright (footballer) (born 1978), English association football player
 Andy Wright (music producer) (born 1962), English music producer and songwriter
 Andy Wright (sound engineer) (21st Century), Australian supervising sound editor

See also
Andrew Wright (disambiguation)